The Triumph Bonneville Bobber is a bobber-style cruiser motorcycle based on the Bonneville series from Triumph Motorcycles Ltd. It was announced late 2016 and began selling in February 2017.

The Bobber's differences from the Bonneville T120 include:
 An adjustable seat that can slide backward or forward and by this tilted higher or lower
 A swing cage mounted to a mono shock absorber which is mostly hidden from the profile view with the illusion that the frame has a hard tail
 The 1200cc engine is detuned for less horsepower in favour of higher torque at a lower engine rpm
 Single front disc brake 
 Slash cut style exhaust pipes instead of the traditional pea-shooter style

In 2020, Triumph introduced a limited edition Triumph Factory Custom (TFC) version of the Bobber. Globally, only 750 of these bikes were produced and each is numbered in the series.

The Bobber TFC features:
 Union Jack treatment on the fuel tank
 Statement seat
 Brushed stainless steel 2 into 2 single-skin exhaust system with Arrow brushed stainless silencers and carbon end caps
 Ohlins front and rear suspension
 Increased HP: 87 PS @ 6,250rpm 
 Increased torque: 110 Nm @ 4,500rpm

References

External links

 2017 Triumph Bobber | First rides video  Motorcyclenews.com

Bonneville Bobber
Cruiser motorcycles
Motorcycles introduced in 2017
Motorcycles powered by straight-twin engines